Mount Carmel Forest Fire may refer to:

 Mount Carmel Forest Fire (1989)
 Mount Carmel Forest Fire (2010)